Clyde Maurice Wood AM (born 7 January 1936) is a retired Australian Anglican bishop.

Wood was educated at Monash University and ordained in 1965. His first ordained ministry position was as a curate of St John's Bentleigh. From 1966 he was curate-in-charge of St Paul's Ringwood. He then held positions at St Philip's Mount Waverley and St Christopher's Armadale, all parishes in Melbourne. In 1978 he became Dean of Christ Church Cathedral, Darwin, and in 1983 he became the second Bishop of the Northern Territory, a position he held until 1992. For four years he was an assistant bishop in the Diocese of Brisbane and in 1996 he was elected  diocesan Bishop of North Queensland and installed there on 12 October 1996. He retired in 2002. He is married to Margaret Wood.

References

1936 births
Monash University alumni
Assistant bishops in the Anglican Diocese of Brisbane
Anglican bishops of the Northern Territory
Anglican bishops of North Queensland
Deans of Darwin
Members of the Order of Australia
Living people